Okoška Gora is a settlement in the Municipality of Oplotnica in eastern Slovenia. It lies on the southern slopes of the Pohorje range east of Oplotnica. The area is part of the traditional region of Styria and is now included in the Drava Statistical Region.

References

External links
Okoška Gora on Geopedia

Populated places in the Municipality of Oplotnica